Sreedhara Panicker Somanath (born July 1963) is an Indian aerospace engineer serving as the chairman of the Indian Space Research Organisation.

Somanath served as the director of Vikram Sarabhai Space Centre, Thiruvananthapuram and director of Liquid Propulsion Systems Centre, Thiruvananthapuram. Somanath is known for his contributions to launch vehicle design, particularly in the areas of launch vehicle systems engineering, structural design, structural dynamics, and pyrotechnics.

Early life and career
Somanath was born in a Malayali Hindu family as a son of Sreedhara Panicker, a Hindi teacher, and Thankamma in Thuravoor, Kerala.

Somanath did his schooling at St Augustine's High School, Aroor and completed his pre-university program from Maharaja's College, Ernakulam. He received his graduate degree in mechanical engineering from Thangal Kunju Musaliar College of Engineering, Kollam, Kerala University and a master's degree in aerospace engineering from Indian Institute of Science, Bangalore with specialization in dynamics and control.

After his graduation, Somanath joined Vikram Sarabhai Space Centre in 1985. He was associated with Polar Satellite Launch Vehicle project during its initial phase. He became associate director of the Vikram Sarabhai Space Centre and the project director of Geosynchronous Satellite Launch Vehicle Mark III launch vehicle in 2010. He was also the deputy director of the Propulsion and Space Ordinance Entity till November 2014.

In June 2015, he took over as director of Liquid Propulsion Systems Centre at Valiamala, Thiruvananthapuram and served until January 2018. Somanath took over as director of the Vikram Sarabhai Space Centre from K. Sivan who became chairman of Indian Space Research Organisation. In January 2022, he took over as the chairman of the Indian Space Research Organisation, again succeeding K. Sivan.

In recognition of his contributions to the field of science, Somanath was awarded a Doctorate of Science (Honoris Causa) on 25th September by SRM Institute of Science and Technology, Tamil Nadu, on the occasion of the 18th Annual Convocation.

References

1963 births
Living people
Indian Space Research Organisation people
Indian Institute of Science alumni
Scientists from Thiruvananthapuram
Indian aerospace engineers
Date of birth missing (living people)
IIT Madras alumni